David Moret (born April 1, 1979) is a Swiss judoka.

Achievements

References

1979 births
Living people
Swiss male judoka
Judoka at the 2000 Summer Olympics
Olympic judoka of Switzerland
Place of birth missing (living people)
20th-century Swiss people